Formula TKM is a British based karting category raced at club and national championships around the UK.  It uses 100cc/115cc 2-stroke TKM engines (BT82) for the Junior and Senior classes respectively.   A number of Britains elite racing drivers have competed in the TKM class at some point in their careers.

History
The TKM karting class was created in 1989 by the British-based kart manufacturer, Tal-Ko. The company owner Alan Turney started the class with the ambition of keeping the large costs of kart racing down while maintaining a level of competitive and equal racing. To maintain the lower prices, only British registered homologated chassis were allowed, along with a Tal-Ko designed engine and hard compound tyres by Maxxis.

The original uptake of the class was successful and with the lower costs involved, the class soared in popularity through the 90s, becoming the UK's most popular karting formula. The TKM Festivals of the late nineties saw over 100 entrants in both senior and junior classes and from this boom the class boasts several current Formula 1 drivers amongst its former racers.

Through second half of the 2000s Tal-Ko introduced a range of new rules for the 2-stroke class in regards to tyres, chassis and engine regulations. With these new rules the class became more relevant and so the numbers of entrants stabilised, despite a mixed set of reactions from people in the sport. It still offers a large field in the Super 1 National Kart Championships and at some club circuits in the UK. Most prevalently the class still finds healthy grids at Kimbolton, Shenington Kart Club and Rissington Kart Club.

Tal-Ko also introduced a 4-stroke class, which ran on 200cc 4-stroke engines.  The series has never been as popular or successful as the 2-stroke TKM class and does not offer a Super One grid.

Classes 
 Junior TKM: For 11- to 16-year-olds. Runs on 100cc TKM BT82 with a restrictor on the carburettor to give consistent power to weight ratios.
 TKM Extreme: Also known as Senior TKM, For those aged 16+, this class runs on 115cc TKM BT82 engines with no restrictor.
 TKM Clubman: For those aged 16+, Aimed for those on a budget. Maximum tread depth of 2.8mm, saving the costs on tires per meeting       
 TKM 4-Stroke Junior: Runs on a 4-stroke 200cc engine with a restrictor on the carburettor to control speeds.
 TKM 4-Stroke Senior: Runs on a 4-stroke 200cc engine with no restrictor.

Racing 

TKM acquired a reputation for close and competitive racing, notably for the extremely large grid entrants. The annual TKM Festival, held at a range of circuits, could once attract over 100 entrants for each class at the event. This is unparalleled for kart racing in the UK during recent history. The class is often cited as the purest form of kart racing owing to the relative simplicity of the racing and the equal playing field.

Although the introduction of the TAG version of the BT82 brought about some fundamental differences between the engine types, the class still offers some of the closest racing in the sport today.

Chassis
Historically it was decided by the organisers that only TKM homologated, British made, chassis should be used for the class. This was opened up, however, to try to compete with the image of the Rotax Max class. MSA homologated chassis from across Europe have been permitted since 2010. Several manufacturers produce a TKM-specific chassis; these include the Tal-Ko Veloce, Tony Kart Viper, BirelArt TKM and Klaassen ARC.

Engine
The class uses a fixed gear, 2-stroke TKM BT82 engine. The Junior engine has a capacity of 100cc and 16.8 BHP (without restrictor). The Senior engine is 115cc and outputs 20 BHP (without restrictor). Tuning of the engines is limited in order to keep costs down. In 2008 Tal-Ko introduced TAG engines featuring an on-board electric start system and centrifugal clutch. To compensate for this additional weight (the heavier engine, starting system and battery combine to add an additional 4.5 kg to the weight), the TAG benefits from a larger exhaust and increased compression. The engine can pull up to around 75 mph.

Tyres
Maxxis produced tyres have been used in the class since its advent. The class organisers restricts the use to a single 'wet' and 'dry' tyre for the class, with the idea of creating a level performance level and removing the costs of requiring new tyres for each race weekend.

The 'new age' dry weather tyre which is currently used was chosen for its relatively hard compound, promoting durability and removing the need to replace them as often. In 2010 a new tyre was introduced which was designed to improve performance.

Historically a hard compound 'wet' tyre was used but to compete with Rotax Max in performance levels, a softer, stickier tyre was introduced into the formula for the 2005 season.

Notable figures
TKM has continually been the breeding ground for many current and former notable motorsport figures.

 2009 Formula 1 world champion Jenson Button was the Junior TKM champion in 1992.
 2008, 2014, 2015 and 2017 Formula 1 world champion Lewis Hamilton dabbled in the Junior TKM championship in the mid 90s.
 Current Formula 1 test driver Gary Paffett won the Junior TKM championship in 1995.
 Formula Super Aguri and BAR driver Anthony Davidson enjoyed success in TKM in the 90s before moving into European karting.
 Current DTM drivers Oliver Jarvis and Jamie Green raced in the 1996 Junior TKM super 1 series.
 James Nash, a current British Touring Car Championship driver and race winner at Rockingham in September 2011. He raced both Junior and Senior TKM in the early 2000s. He came 2nd in TKM Extreme in 2004.
 Current British Touring Car Championship racer Tom Onslow-Cole progressed in the Junior categories in the early 2000s, finishing 8th in Junior TKM 2001.
 Current British GT Driver Scott Malvern also a former British Champion in Formula Ford & Formula Renault raced in Junior TKM 2002-4 & Senior TKM Extreme 2005 when he finished as Super One runner up to Adam Constable
 2010 GP2 6th-place finisher Oliver Turvey finished 6th in Junior TKM in 2001.
 Abbi Pulling became the first female driver to win a British Championship in a TKM category by winning the Junior TKM class in 2017,  she repeated this achievement in 2018.

List of British Champions

FORMULA TKM BRITISH CHAMPIONS

FORMULA JUNIOR TKM BRITISH CHAMPIONS

List of British Open Champions

JUNIOR O PLATE CHAMPIONS

SENIOR O PLATE CHAMPIONS

CLUBMAN O PLATE CHAMPIONS

List of TKM Festival Winners

TKM FESTIVAL SENIOR WINNERS

TKM FESTIVAL JUNIOR WINNERS

TKM FESTIVAL CLUBMAN CHAMPIONS

List of TKM Clubman Championship Winners

TKM CLUBMAN REGIONAL CHAMPIONSHIP WINNERS

List of Club Champions

HUNTS KART CLUB SENIOR TKM CHAMPIONS

HUNTS KART CLUB JUNIOR TKM CHAMPIONS

CKRC KART CLUB SENIOR TKM CHAMPIONS

(* Void due to COVID-19 Outbreak)

CKRC KART CLUB JUNIOR TKM CHAMPIONS

(* Void due to COVID-19 Outbreak)

References

External links 
 http://www.tal-ko.com/
 https://kartcup.co.uk
 http://www.s1series.co.uk/default.aspx
 http://www.karting1.co.uk
 http://www.karting.co.uk
 http://www.abkc.org.uk/startkart.htm
 https://www.youtube.com/watch?v=MGHRP6xIqdI

Kart racing